As originally stated in terms of direct-current resistive circuits only, Thévenin's theorem states that "Any linear electrical network containing only voltage sources, current sources and resistances can be replaced at terminals  by an equivalent combination of a voltage source  in a series connection with a resistance ."

 The equivalent voltage  is the voltage obtained at terminals  of the network with terminals  open circuited.
 The equivalent resistance  is the resistance that the circuit between terminals  and  would have if all ideal voltage sources in the circuit were replaced by a short circuit and all ideal current sources were replaced by an open circuit. 

In circuit theory terms, the theorem allows any one-port network to be reduced to a single voltage source and a single impedance.

The theorem also applies to frequency domain AC circuits consisting of reactive (inductive and capacitive) and resistive impedances. It means the theorem applies for AC in an exactly same way to DC except that resistances are generalized to impedances.

The theorem was independently derived in 1853 by the German scientist Hermann von Helmholtz and in 1883 by Léon Charles Thévenin (1857–1926), an electrical engineer with France's national Postes et Télégraphes telecommunications organization.

Thévenin's theorem and its dual, Norton's theorem, are widely used to make circuit analysis simpler and to study a circuit's initial-condition and steady-state response. Thévenin's theorem can be used to convert any circuit's sources and impedances to a Thévenin equivalent; use of the theorem may in some cases be more convenient than use of Kirchhoff's circuit laws.

Calculating the Thévenin equivalent 
The equivalent circuit is a voltage source with voltage  in series with a resistance .

The Thévenin-equivalent voltage  is the open-circuit voltage at the output terminals of the original circuit. When calculating a Thévenin-equivalent voltage, the voltage divider principle is often useful, by declaring one terminal to be  and the other terminal to be at the ground point.

The Thévenin-equivalent resistance  is the resistance measured across points  and  "looking back" into the circuit. The resistance is measured after replacing all voltage- and current-sources with their internal resistances. That means an ideal voltage source is replaced with a short circuit, and an ideal current source is replaced with an open circuit. Resistance can then be calculated across the terminals using the formulae for series and parallel circuits. This method is valid only for circuits with independent sources.

As a mnemonic, the Thevenin replacements for voltage and current sources can be remembered as the sources' values (meaning their voltage or current) are set to zero. A zero valued voltage source would create a potential difference of zero volts between its terminals, just like an ideal short circuit would do, with two leads touching; therefore the source is replaced with a short circuit. Similarly, a zero valued current source and an open circuit both pass zero current.

Example

In the example, calculating the equivalent voltage:

Calculating equivalent resistance ( is the total resistance of two parallel resistors):

Conversion to a Norton equivalent

A Norton equivalent circuit is related to the Thévenin equivalent by

Practical limitations
 Many circuits are only linear over a certain range of values, thus the Thévenin equivalent is valid only within this linear range.
 The Thévenin equivalent has an equivalent I–V characteristic only from the point of view of the load.
 The power dissipation of the Thévenin equivalent is not necessarily identical to the power dissipation of the real system. However, the power dissipated by an external resistor between the two output terminals is the same regardless of how the internal circuit is implemented.

A proof of the theorem
The proof involves two steps. The first step is to use superposition theorem to construct a solution. Then, uniqueness theorem is employed to show that the obtained solution is unique. It is noted that the second step is usually implied in literature.

By using superposition of specific configurations, it can be shown that for any linear "black box" circuit which contains voltage sources and resistors, its voltage is a linear function of the corresponding current as follows 

Here, the first term reflects the linear summation of contributions from each voltage source, while the second term measures the contributions from all the resistors. 
The above expression is obtained by using the fact that the voltage of the black box for a given current  is identical to the linear superposition of the solutions of the following problems: (1) to leave the black box open circuited but activate individual voltage source one at a time and, (2) to short circuit all the voltage sources but feed the circuit with a certain ideal voltage source so that the resulting current exactly reads  (Alternatively, one can use an ideal current source of current ).

Now, the uniqueness theorem guarantees that the result is general. In other words, the above relation holds true independent of what the "black box" is plugged to.

In three-phase circuits

In 1933, A. T. Starr published a generalization of Thévenin's theorem in an article of the magazine Institute of Electrical Engineers Journal, titled A New Theorem for Active Networks, which states that any three-terminal active linear network can be substituted by three voltage sources with corresponding impedances, connected in wye or in delta.

See also 
 Extra element theorem
 Maximum power transfer theorem
 Millman's theorem
 Source transformation

References

Further reading
 
 First-Order Filters: Shortcut via Thévenin Equivalent Source — showing on p. 4 complex circuit's Thévenin's theorem simplication to first-order low-pass filter and associated voltage divider, time constant and gain.

External links

Circuit theorems
Linear electronic circuits